The Lima Peru Los Olivos Temple is a temple of the Church of Jesus Christ of Latter-day Saints (LDS Church) under construction in San Martin de Porres district, Lima, Peru.

History
The intent to construct the temple was announced by church president Thomas S. Monson on April 3, 2016, during the Sunday morning session of the church's general conference.  The Quito Ecuador, Belém Brazil and Harare Zimbabwe temples were announced at the same time. The church later announced the second temple in Peru would be named the Lima Peru Los Olivos Temple.

As of April 2016, the church has reported there are approximately 557,000 church members in Peru. On March 7, 2019, the LDS Church announced the groundbreaking to signify beginning of construction that was held on June 8, 2019, with Enrique R. Falabella, president of the church's South America Northwest Area, presiding.

The temple is planned to be completed in 2022. Some delays may occur as a result of the coronavirus pandemic.

See also

 Comparison of temples of The Church of Jesus Christ of Latter-day Saints
 List of temples of The Church of Jesus Christ of Latter-day Saints
 List of temples of The Church of Jesus Christ of Latter-day Saints by geographic region
 Temple architecture (Latter-day Saints)

References

External links
Lima Peru Los Olivos Temple at ChurchofJesusChristTemples.org

Proposed religious buildings and structures of the Church of Jesus Christ of Latter-day Saints
21st-century Latter Day Saint temples
Buildings and structures in Lima
Proposed buildings and structures in Peru
Temples (LDS Church) in Peru